Samantha Tierney (born 8 October 1998) is an English footballer who plays as a midfielder or defender for Leicester City. She started her career as an academy player at Sheffield United, before joining Doncaster Rovers Belles in 2014, rejoining Sheffield United in 2018, and signing with Leicester City in 2020. Her goal against London City Lionesses in April 2021 helped confirm Leicester's promotion to the Women's Super League ahead of the 2021–22 season.

References

External links

Leicester City W.F.C. profile

1998 births
Living people
English women's footballers
Women's association football defenders
Footballers from Sheffield
Doncaster Rovers Belles L.F.C. players
Sheffield United W.F.C. players
Leicester City W.F.C. players
Women's Super League players
Women's Championship (England) players